KiEw is a German electro-industrial project from Lüneburg in Lower Saxony, Germany. It was founded in late 1990 by Andreas "Thedi" Thedens in order to make music inspired by Thedis lyrics, that made him a local hero of Lüneburg underground culture.

History
KiEw began with avant-garde and dada-industrial sound experiments and later changed to more rhythmic power electro-industrial/power noise upon the release of Feierabend in 2000. The band uses a lot of break beat, techno elements, and voice samples from movies and audio books, among other sources. The band has been signed to Out Of Line Music since 2000. The main themes of the music are insanity, schizophrenia, paranoia, and therapy.

The first lineup of KiEw consisted of founder Andreas "Thedi" Thedens and his school friends Thilo Eichenberg, Birk Lübberstedt and Jan Michel Luckow. After the early recording sessions beginning of 1991, Birk Lübberstedt left the band. Tassilo Schmitt joined during the first sessions and also Thomas "Biwi" Bierbach became a new band member as a singer and percussionist. In December 1993 KiEw had its live debut at Dorfgemeinschafthaus Ochtmissen near Lüneburg (Lower Saxony/Germany). Meanwhile, Tassilo Schmitt did not identify with KiEws music and aims anymore, so he left. Stephan "Thiemi" Thiemicke joined the band for playing bass, analog synth, and live performance shouting. Thilo Eichenberg (guitar) took part in the rehearsals, but left a short time before the debut show at Dorfgemeinschaftshaus Ochtmissen. Matthias Kulcke became new guitarist. Together with Stephan Thiemicke (bass), Martin Mälzer (guitar, vocals), and Thorsten Krolow (drums) he also formed the band Mohai in the early 90s.

In 2000 Thomas Bierbach and Jan Michel Luckow left, so KiEw became a trio until 2010, when Martin Mälzer (vocals, drums) officially joined KiEw. Before becoming an official member, Martin Mälzers voice appeared on some KiEw releases. He was special guest at some KiEw live shows as a singer, did remixes for KiEw and assisted the KiEw audio engineer Hauke Dressler several times since 2009. In 2017 Martin Mälzer resigned from the band after the Primal Uproar Festival at Motorschiff Stubnitz in Hamburg in July.

Members
Andreas "Thedi" Thedens
Matthias Kulcke (since 1993)
Stephan "Thiemi" Thiemicke (since 1993)

Former members
Birk Lübberstedt (1990–1991)
Tassilo Schmitt (1991–1993)
Thilo Eichenberg (1990–1993)
Jan Michel Luckow (1990–2000)
Thomas "Biwi" Bierbach (1991–2000)
Martin Mälzer (2010–2017)

Discography

Albums, EPs, Vinyl
Feierabend – (CD, EP) 2000 - KickBox
Divergent – (CD) 2001 - Out Of Line
Diskette – (CD, EP) 2003 - Out Of Line
Audiotherapy – (CD Album + DVD) 2004 - Out Of Line
Festplatte – (12", Ltd. Edition White Vinyl [300 copies]) 2004 - Out Of Line
Exit #72 – (CD, EP) 2005 - Out Of Line
Visite – (CD, Limited to 500 copies sold at 15 years of KiEw anniversary show) 2006 - Out Of Line
mental [per]mutation - (2 CD, Album) 2010 - Out Of Line

CDr Recordings
Die Geburt deines Kalbes erfüllt unser Dorf mit Freude (remastered) – (2CDr, Ltd. Edition [10 copies]) 1997 - no label
Sauberkeit – (CDr, Ltd. Edition [77 copies]) 1997 - no label
kiew killz! – (CDr, Ltd. Edition [111 copies]) 1998 - no label
Aas, 500m (Ilmenau Edition) – (CDr, Ltd. Edition [25 copies]) 1999 - no label
Aas, 500m (Bielefeld Edition) – (CDr, Ltd. Edition [25 copies]) 1999 - no label
Aas, 500m (Dresden Edition) – (CDr, Ltd. Edition [25 copies]) 1999 - no label
Aas, 500m (Living Dead Edition) – (CDr, Ltd. Edition [75 copies]) 1999 - no label
Aas, 500m (black Living Dead Edition) – (CDr, Ltd. Edition [2 copies]) 1999 - no label

Demo Tapes
Operationssaal (1991)
Kühlschrank (1992)
Untitled (1993)
Die Geburt deines Kalbes erfüllt unser Dorf mit Freude (1994)

Compilation appearances
E – (CD) 1999, Track #1 "Feierabend In Kiew" - Kafue Systeme
Electro Club Attack - Shot Three – (2xCD) 2000, Disc #1, Track #13 "Feierabend" -
Electro Technik - The Very Limited Collection Vol. 3 – (CD) 2000, Track #11 "Gerüchte Aus Kiew (KiEw Kontact Mix)" - VLE Media
Access [One] – (2xCD) 2001, Disc #2, Track #10 "Heisse Silke" - XXC
Awake The Machines Vol. 3 – (CD) 2001, Track #9 "Graograman" - Out of Line
Electro Club Attack - Shot Four (2xCD) 2001, Disc #1, Track #5 "Gerüchte" - XXC, Zoomshot Media Entertainment
Extreme Jenseitshymnen 1 – (CD) 2001, Track #6 "Feierabend In Kiew" - UpSolution Recordings
Gothic Compilation Part XIV – (CD Enhanced) 2001, Track #1 "Heisse Silke" - Batbeliever Releases
Industrial for the Masses – (CD) 2001, Track #14 "Ausser Kontrolle (Kurzschluss Edit)" and Track #15 "Staub (Stoned)" - Out of Line
Machineries of Joy – (2xCD, Ltd. Edition [3000 copies]) 2001, Disc #1, Track #16 "Zimmer 72" - Out of Line
Wellenreiter In Schwarz Vol. 5 – (2xCD) 2001, Disc #2, Track #8 "Feierabend" - Nova Tekk
Extreme Jenseitshymnen 2 – (CD) 2002, Track #5 "Graograman (Death Surrounds Mix)" - UpSolution Recordings
Machineries of Joy Vol. 2 – (2xCD) 2002, Disc #2, Track #15 "Sojifu" - Out of Line
Sliding Horse One – (CD) 2002, Track #10 "Graograman" - Sliding Horse
Awake the Machines Vol. 4 – (CD) 2003, Track #18 "DCDisk" - Out of Line
DSSG - Der Sampler 2 – (CD Sampler) 2003, Track #2 "Tunnel (Live at Matrix, Bochum, 2002-12-13)" - no label
Extreme Clubhits VIII – (CD) 2003, Track #4 "Tunnel" - UpSolution Recordings
Advanced Electronics Vol. 3 – (2xCD) 2004, Disc #2, Track #15 "DCDisk" - Synthetic Symphony
Industrial for the Masses Vol. 2 (Limited Edition) – (2xCD) 2004, Disc #1, Track #16 "DCDisk (Marble Mix)" - Out of Line
Intensivstation - (CD) 2004, Track #3 "DCDisk (Soman Special Edit)" - Totentanz
Machineries of Joy Vol. 3 – (2xCD, Ltd. Edition) - (2xCD) 2004, Disc #2, Track #15 "Odessa" - Out of Line
Zillo Club Hits 9 – (CD) 2004, Track #12 "DCDisk (DD Version)" - Zillo
Awake the Machines Vol. 5 – (2xCD, Ltd. Edition) 2005, Disc #2, Track #14 "Synapsenbrecher (13th Monkey Remix)" - Out of Line
Bodybeats – (CD) 2005, Track #14 "Graograman (F/A/V Remix)" - COP International
Celebrate the Machines - An Out of Line 10th Anniversary Megamix! – (CD Sampler, Ltd. Edition) 2005, Track #10 "Feierabend In Kiew" - Out of Line
M'era Luna Festival 2005 – (2xCD) 2005, Disc #1, Track #13 "Nachtwache" - Totentanz
New Signs & Sounds 12/05-01/06 – (CD Sampler, Enhanced) 2005, Track #6 "Gabriel (Architect Remix)" - Zillo
This Is... Techno Body Music Vol. 1 – (2xCD) 2005, Disc #1, Track #11 "Zimmer 72 (Rob Acid Remix)" - Masterhit Recordings
Advanced Electronics Vol. 5 – (2xCD + DVD) 2006, DVD Track #4 "Nachtwache" - Synthetic Symphony
Dark Flower Vol. II – (2xCD) 2006, Disc #2, Track #5 "Gabriel (Convulsive Therapy By Skinjob Mix)" - Angelstar
Industrial for the Masses Vol. 3 – (2xCD, Ltd. Edition) 2006, Disc #1, Track #7 "Mr. 29 (Feat. Ambassador 21)" - Out of Line
Out of Line Festival Vol. 2 – (DVD) 2006, Track #18 "Feierabend In Kiew" - Out of Line
Public Convenience II – (12") 2006, Side A, Track #3 "Sojifu (Kinderlandmix)" - Restroom Records
Scenes from a Galton's Walk – (CD) 2006, Track #11 "Killers (Nachtwache-RMX Re-Edit)" - Ant-Zen
Cut&Go – (CDr) 2007, Track #10 "Mister 29 (Ambassador 21 Remix)" - Invasion Wreck Chords
Machineries of Joy Vol. 4 – (2xCD) 2007, Disc #2, Track #15 "Delusion" - Out of Line
Awake the Machines Vol. 6 – (2xCD, Ltd. Edition) 2008, Disc #2, Track #15 "Käferfrühstück (7 Uhr Edit)" - Out of Line
Advanced Electronics Vol. 7 – (2xCD + DVD) 2008, Disc #2, Track #10 "Käferfrühstück (8 Uhr Edit)" - Synthetic Symphony
Kinetik Festival Volume One – (2xCD) 2008, Disc #1, Track #6 "Graograman (Death Surrounds)" - Artoffact Records
Brainstorm Compilation 1 – (2xCD) 2009, Disc #2, Track #11 "Harvey" - Not on Label
Industrial for the Masses Vol. 4 – (2xCD, Ltd. Edition) 2010, Disc #1, Track #6 "Stille/Stimme (IFTM Edit)" - Out Of Line
Extreme Störfrequenz 5 – (CD) 2010, Track #12 "Käferfrühstück" - UpScene
Awake The Machines Vol. 7 – (3xCD) 2011, Disc #3, Track #15 "Unter Dem Grund (Underground Version)" - Out Of Line
Musik Für Eingeweide Vol. 1 – (CD) 2012, Track #10 "Staub (Live)" - Empty Room Exploration

External links

Electro-industrial music groups
German musical groups